Egon Horst (25 November 1938 – 14 February 2015) was a German football player. He spent six seasons in the Bundesliga with FC Schalke 04 and Hamburger SV.

Honours
 UEFA Cup Winners' Cup finalist: 1967–68
 DFB-Pokal finalist: 1966–67

References

External links
 

1938 births
2015 deaths
German footballers
FC Schalke 04 players
Hamburger SV players
Bundesliga players
Association football defenders
People from Aschaffenburg
Sportspeople from Lower Franconia
Footballers from Bavaria
West German footballers